George Cecil Weld-Forester, 3rd Baron Forester PC (10 May 1807 – 14 February 1886), styled The Honourable George Weld-Forester between 1821 and 1874, was a British Conservative politician and army officer. He notably served as Comptroller of the Household in 1852 and from 1858 to 1859. A long-standing MP, he was Father of the House of Commons from 1873 to 1874, when he succeeded his elder brother in the barony and took a seat in the House of Lords.

Background
Weld-Forester, born at Sackville Street, London was the second son of Cecil Weld-Forester, 1st Baron Forester, and Lady Katherine Mary Manners, daughter of Charles Manners, 4th Duke of Rutland. His elder brother John Weld-Forester, 2nd Baron Forester, was also a Tory politician.  Both the brothers had, as godfather at the same christening, the Prince of Wales, later King George IV, a personal friend of their father.

He was educated at Westminster School.

Military career
Weld-Forester entered the British Army on commission in 1824, and became Lieutenant-Colonel of the Royal Horse Guards in 1853.  He was promoted to staff rank as Major-General in 1863 and Lieutenant-General in 1871, retiring, aged seventy, as full General in 1877 but he saw no campaign service.

Political career
Weld-Forester succeeded his brother as Member of Parliament for Wenlock in 1828, a seat he would hold for 46 years. He had been Groom of the Bedchamber to William IV from 1830 to 1831 and served in the first two Conservative administrations of the Earl of Derby as Comptroller of the Household between February and December 1852 and from 1858 to 1859. He was admitted to the Privy Council in 1852. In 1873 he became Father of the House of Commons as the longest-serving member (then 45 years) of the House. The following year he succeeded his elder brother as third Baron Forester and entered the House of Lords. In 1878 he served as treasurer of the Salop Infirmary in Shrewsbury.

Personal life
Lord Forester married the Honourable Mary Anne Jervis, daughter of Edward Jervis, 2nd Viscount St Vincent, and widow of David Ochterlony Dyce Sombre, in 1862. They had no children. He died at 3 Carlton Gardens, London, in February 1886, aged 78, and was buried at Willey parish church. He was succeeded in the barony by his younger brother, Reverend Orlando Weld-Forester. Lady Forester died in March 1893. The Lady Foresters Convalescent Home in Llandudno was opened in Lord Forester's honour in 1902.

References

External links

1807 births
1886 deaths
Barons in the Peerage of the United Kingdom
Younger sons of barons
Members of the Parliament of the United Kingdom for English constituencies
Members of the Privy Council of the United Kingdom
UK MPs 1826–1830
UK MPs 1830–1831
UK MPs 1831–1832
UK MPs 1832–1835
UK MPs 1835–1837
UK MPs 1837–1841
UK MPs 1841–1847
UK MPs 1847–1852
UK MPs 1852–1857
UK MPs 1857–1859
UK MPs 1859–1865
UK MPs 1865–1868
UK MPs 1868–1874
Forester, B3
People educated at Westminster School, London
British Army generals
Royal Horse Guards officers